Andrii Shapovalov (born November 10, 1993) is a Ukrainian professional basketball player for Kharkivski Sokoly in the Ukrainian Basketball Superleague.

Early life

Club career
In season 2018/2019 playing for Sokół Ostrów Mazowiecka he was named one of the best players in the second division of Poland championship.

In September 2019, Shapovalov returned to Kharkivski Sokoly.

References

1993 births
Living people
Point guards
BC Kharkivski Sokoly players
Ukrainian men's basketball players
Sportspeople from Kharkiv